The FIBA U16 Women's European Championship is a basketball competition inaugurated in 1976. The current champions are France.

Division A

Results

Medal table
 Defunct states in italics

Participation details 

 As FR Yugoslavia (1992–2003, 4 participations, 2 medals) and as Serbia and Montenegro (2004–2006, 3 participations, 1 medal)

Division B

Results

* Since 2012, the 3rd team in Division B is also promoted to Division A for the next tournament.

Performances by nation

Division C

Results

Performances by nation

See also 
 EuroBasket Women
 FIBA U20 Women's European Championship
 FIBA U18 Women's European Championship

References

 Archive FIBA

External links
 Official site

 
Recurring sporting events established in 1976
Women's basketball competitions in Europe between national teams
Europe